This is a list of Portuguese writers, ordered alphabetically by surname.

A
João Aguiar (1943–2010)
Manuel Alegre (born 1936), poet
Afonso de Albuquerque (1453–1515)
Ana Luísa Amaral (born 1956)
Eugénio de Andrade pseudonym of José Fontinhas (1923–2005), poet
Maria Archer (1899–1982)
Carlos Lobo de Ávila (1860-1895)

B
António Gonçalves de Bandarra (1500–1556)
Ana de Sousa Baptista (born 1971)
João de Barros (1496–1570), historian
Ruy Belo (1933–1978)
Al Berto pseudonym of Alberto Raposo Pidwell Tavares (1948–1997), poet
Sara Beirão (1880–1974) 
Francisco Manuel de Melo Breyner (1837–1903)
Agustina Bessa-Luís (1922–2019)
Abel Botelho (1855–1917)
António Botto (1892–1959)
Fiama Hasse Pais Brandão (1938–2007)
Raul Brandão (1867–1930)
Lurdes Breda (born 1970)

C
António Cabral (1931–2007)
Luís de Camões (1527–1580)
Miguel Esteves Cardoso (born 1955)
Fernão Lopes de Castanheda (1500–1559)
Camilo Castelo Branco (1825–1890)
António Feliciano de Castilho (1800–1875)
Eugénio de Castro (1869–1944)
Ferreira de Castro (1898–1974)
Públia Hortênsia de Castro (1548–1595), humanist and courtier
Gaspar Correia (1492–1563,) 16th-century historian
Hélia Correia (born 1949)
Natália Correia (1923–1993)
Maria Velho da Costa (1938–2020)

D
Luísa Dacosta (1927–2015)
Júlio Dantas (1876–1962), journalist, writer
Joaquim Paço d'Arcos (1908-1979), novelist, poet
João de Deus (1830–1896), poet, writer, teacher of a new read-learning method
José António Duro (1875–1899), poet

E
Florbela Espanca (1894–1930), poet, writer
Sofia Ester (born 1978)

F
Cristóvão Falcão (1512–1557)
José Fernandes Fafe, (1927–2017)
António Ferreira (poet) (1528–1569)
José Gomes Ferreira (1900–1985)
Vergílio Ferreira (1916–1996)
Lília da Fonseca (1906-1991)
Manuel da Fonseca (1911–1993)
Raquel Freire (born 1973), screenwriter, novelist

G
Joana da Gama (–1586)
Almeida Garrett (1799–1854), playwright
António Gedeão (1906–1997), writer, doctor, poet
Augusto Gil (1873–1929), poet
Damião de Góis (1502–1574)
Vasco Graça Moura (1942–2014)
Pedro Guilherme-Moreira (born 1969)

H
Herberto Helder (1930–2015), poet
Alexandre Herculano (1810–1877), writer, poet, major historian
Maria Teresa Horta (born 1937)

J
Lídia Jorge (born 1946)
Guerra Junqueiro (1850–1923)

L
Irene Lisboa (1892–1958), poet, essayist
Maria Gabriela Llansol (1931–2008)
Rosa Lobato Faria (1932–2010)
António Lobo Antunes (born 1942)
Fernão Lopes (1385–1460)

M
António de Macedo (1931–2017)
Álvaro Magalhães (born 1951)
Maria Aurora (1937–2010), poet, novelist, children's writer
Sophia de Mello Breyner Andresen (1919–2004)
Joaquim Pedro de Oliveira Martins (1845-1894)
Francisco Manuel de Melo (1608–1666)
José Bragança de Miranda (born 1953), essayist 
Wenceslau de Moraes (1854–1929), poet, writer, orientalist
David Mourão-Ferreira (1927–1996), poet, novelist, critic
Valter Hugo Mãe (1971-)

N
Almada Negreiros (1893–1970)
Vitorino Nemésio (1901–1978)
António Nobre (1867–1900), poet

O
Raquel Ochoa (born 1980)
Carlos de Oliveira (1921–1981)
Alexandre O'Neill (1924–1986)
Ramalho Ortigão (1836–1915)
Ana de Castro Osório (1873–1935), writer, journalist, pioneer of feminism

P
Luiz Pacheco (1925–2008), writer, polemist, literature critic
Teixeira de Pascoaes (1877–1952), poet, writer
Inês Pedrosa (born 1962), journalist, novelist, short story writer, children's writer, playwright
José Luís Peixoto (born 1974)
Soeiro Pereira Gomes (1909–1949), neo-realist writer
Camilo Pessanha (1867–1926), poet
Fernando Pessoa (1888–1935), poet
Fernão Mendes Pinto (1509–1583)
José Cardoso Pires (1925–1998)

Q
Eça de Queiroz (1845–1900)
Antero de Quental (1842–1891)

R
Alves Redol (1911–1969), neo-realist writer
José Régio pseudonym of José Maria dos Reis Pereira (1901–1969)
Garcia de Resende (1470–1536)
Aquilino Ribeiro (1885–1963), neo-realist writer
Bernardim Ribeiro (1482–1552)
Francisco Rodrigues Lobo (1580–1622)

S
Mário de Sá-Carneiro (1890–1916)
Francisco de Sá de Miranda (1481-1558)
Bernardo Santareno pseudonym of António Martinho do Rosário (1924–1980)
Ana Eduarda Santos (born 1983), novelist 
Ary dos Santos (1936–1984), poet
José Hermano Saraiva (1919-2012), historian
Rui Miguel Saramago (born 1969)
José Saramago (1922–2010), Nobel Prize for Literature in 1998
António Sardinha (1888–1925)
Agostinho da Silva (1906–1994)
António José da Silva (1705–1739), dramatist
Miguel Sousa Tavares (born 1952)
Isabel Stilwell (born 1960)

T
Urbano Tavares Rodrigues (1923–2013)
Manuel Tiago pseudonym of Álvaro Cunhal (1913–2005)
Miguel Torga (1907–1955)

V
Mário Cesariny de Vasconcelos (1923–2006), poet
Joana Vaz (c. 1500 – after 1570), poet and courtier
Álvaro Velho (15th–16th century)
Fernando Venâncio (born 1944)
Cesário Verde (1855–1886), poet
Gil Vicente (1465–1537)

Z
Gomes Eanes de Zurara (died 1474)
Richard Zimler (born 1956)

See also
List of Portuguese-language poets
List of Portuguese novelists
List of Portuguese women writers

References

Portuguese
Writers
List